Valtioneuvos (Finnish for “counsellor of state”) is a Finnish title of honor awarded by the President of Finland to elder statesmen. It is one of two titles (the other being vuorineuvos) in the highest class of State of Finland honors. A tax on the titles of 48,400 euros or 12,100 euros must be paid by whoever proposes the title to a holder.

Some former Social Democratic prime ministers such as Rafael Paasio, Kalevi Sorsa and Paavo Lipponen all declined the honor when it was offered to them. Lipponen commented that no one outside Finland knows what valtioneuvos is, and that he is satisfied with "former Prime Minister".

Title holders

References

Honorary titles
Finnish culture